This is a list of active and armed militia organizations in the United States. While the two largest militias are the Oath Keepers and the 3 Percenters, there are numerous smaller groups.

Background 

The Southern Poverty Law Center (SPLC) identified 334 militia groups at their peak in 2011. It identified 276 in 2015, up from 202 in 2014. In 2016, the SPLC identified a total of 165 armed militia groups within the United States.

National groups 
, the following militia groups have a national presence: 
The Constitutional Sheriffs
 Oath Keepers
Not Fucking Around Coalition
 Three Percenters
Proud Boys
Boogaloo movement

Statewide groups

Local groups

Inactive groups 

Several militia organizations have since become inactive including:

See also 
 Occupation of the Malheur National Wildlife Refuge
 WHYU-LP, a low-power radio station operated by the American Militia Association

Notes

References 

Political movements in the United States

United States politics-related lists
Lists of military units and formations of the United States
Lists of organizations based in the United States